The American Country Countdown Awards were a country music award presentation that was held in 2014 and 2016. Produced by Dick Clark Productions and co-branded with the syndicated radio show American Country Countdown, it featured awards based on album sales, touring data, and radio airplay (with the exception of the Breakthrough Artist of the Year award which is fan-voted).

The ACCAs were broadcast by Fox, serving as a de facto replacement for their previous American Country Awards show.

Hosts

2014 

Performers

2016 
Winners

Performers

Most wins
 Luke Bryan - 5
 Florida Georgia Line - 4
 Sam Hunt - 2
 Jason Aldean - 1
 Kelsea Ballerini - 1
 Kenny Chesney - 1
 Eric Church - 1
 Brett Eldredge - 1
 Miranda Lambert - 1
 Little Big Town - 1
 Kip Moore - 1
 Old Dominion - 1
 Thomas Rhett - 1
 Chris Stapleton - 1
 Carrie Underwood - 1

References

External links
 theaccawards.com - official homepage

American country music
Fox Broadcasting Company original programming
American music awards
Awards established in 2014
Country music awards
2014 establishments in the United States